The 1986 The Winston, the second running of the NASCAR All-Star Race, was a stock car racing competition that took place on May 11, 1986. The only time The Winston was held at Atlanta International Raceway in Hampton, Georgia, the 83-lap race was the second exhibition race in the 1986 NASCAR Winston Cup Series.

The event featured the Atlanta Invitational, a 100-lap race for drivers who did not meet the eligibility of The Winston. The Atlanta Invitational was held before The Winston, but due to a tape delay, ESPN aired the race after The Winston.

NASCAR's original plan for The Winston was to hold the race at a different track every year, but due to the dismal attendance of this race, The Winston was moved back to Charlotte Motor Speedway for the next 32 years before Bristol Motor Speedway hosted the 2020 NASCAR All-Star Race.

Background

The Winston was open to race winners from the 1985 season. Because the field was one short of the minimum requirement of 10 cars, the final spot was awarded to the highest finishing driver in the 1985 points standings without a win. The pole position was awarded to the defending Winston Cup champion while the rest of the field was determined by the total number of wins from last season, with driver's points used as the tiebreaker.

1986 The Winston drivers and eligibility

Race winners in 1985
3-Dale Earnhardt (4 wins)
9-Bill Elliott (11 wins, including the 1985 Daytona 500)
10-Greg Sacks (1 win)
11-Darrell Waltrip (3 wins, defending 1985 champion)
12-Neil Bonnett (2 wins)
15-Ricky Rudd (1 win)
28-Cale Yarborough (2 wins)
33-Harry Gant (3 wins)
44-Terry Labonte (1 win)

Awarded by points
5-Geoff Bodine (5th in 1985 driver's points)

Race summary

Atlanta Invitational
The Atlanta Invitational was a 100-lap exhibition race featuring 14 participants that did not meet the eligibility of The Winston. The win also gave him the eligibility to run the 1987 Winston.

The Winston
The earnings were as follows:

Chevrolet Monte Carlo driver Darrell Waltrip and Ford Thunderbird driver Bill Elliott led the field on the green flag. Despite being the pole sitter, Waltrip lost momentum as Elliott and Dale Earnhardt passed him before the first lap. Prior to the first pit stop, Waltrip struggled with an ill-handling car as he dropped below the top five while Cale Yarborough and Harry Gant battled for third and Neil Bonnett and Geoff Bodine fought for fifth place. With no one close enough to challenge him, Elliott earned  by leading laps 20 and 30. The two-tire pit stop began on lap 40. After changing left-side tires, Elliott passed Earnhardt at full speed to regain the lead. He once again collected  for leading laps 50 and 60. Elliott dominated the race and took the checkered flag to win  with Earnhardt, Gant, Waltrip, and Yarborough wrapping up the top five.

References

Winston, The
Winston, The
NASCAR races at Atlanta Motor Speedway
NASCAR All-Star Race